Sanka Wijegunaratne (born 21 September 1983) is a Sri Lankan cricketer. He made his List A debut for Polonnaruwa District in the 2016–17 Districts One Day Tournament on 18 March 2017.

References

External links
 

1983 births
Living people
Sri Lankan cricketers
Polonnaruwa District cricketers
People from Kalutara